Dunley may refer to two places in England:
Dunley, Hampshire
Dunley, Worcestershire

See also 
 Dunlay, Texas